Auguste George Airport  is the northernmost airport in the British Virgin Islands and is located on the island of Anegada. The airport is named for Captain Auguste George.

Airlines and destinations
One Scheduled Carrier V I Airlink, that links the British Virgin Islands and St. Thomas US Virgin Islands to Anegada. There are only a handful of air charter companies who serve the island. Island Birds Air Charter and Fly BVI Ltd offer direct on-demand air charter service from Beef Island (Tortola), Virgin Gorda, St. Thomas, San Juan, Antigua and St. Maarten to the aerodrome on Anegada. This service is also provided by Island Birds Air Charter.

References

External links
 Anegada airports

Airports in the British Virgin Islands
Anegada